Strangled Harmony is a 1915 American silent comedy film featuring Oliver Hardy.

Cast
 Bobby Burns - Pokes
 Walter Stull - Jabbs
 Billy Ruge - Runt
 Ethel Marie Burton - Ethel (as Ethel Burton)
 Oliver Hardy - (as Babe Hardy)
 Frank Hanson
 Edna Reynolds

See also
 List of American films of 1915
 Oliver Hardy filmography

External links

1915 films
American silent short films
American black-and-white films
1915 comedy films
1915 short films
Silent American comedy films
American comedy short films
1910s American films